The 1994 Brazilian Grand Prix (formally the XXIII Grande Prêmio do Brasil) was a Formula One motor race held on 27 March 1994 at the Autódromo José Carlos Pace, São Paulo. It was the first race of the 1994 Formula One World Championship.

The 71-lap race was won by German driver Michael Schumacher, driving a Benetton-Ford, after starting from second position. Local hero Ayrton Senna took pole position in his Williams-Renault and led before being overtaken by Schumacher at the first round of pit stops, after which he spun off. Senna's British teammate Damon Hill finished second, with Frenchman Jean Alesi third in a Ferrari.

Background 
The first race of the 1994 season saw five drivers made their F1 debuts: Heinz-Harald Frentzen, Olivier Panis, Jos Verstappen, Olivier Beretta and Roland Ratzenberger. There were also two new teams: Simtek, who had previously been involved in F1 as the designers of the Andrea Moda S921 in 1992, and Pacific Racing, who had enjoyed much success in lower formulae.

Qualifying report 
In his first race for Williams, Ayrton Senna took pole position by 0.3 of a second from Michael Schumacher's Benetton. Jean Alesi was third in his Ferrari, over a second behind Schumacher, with Damon Hill fourth in the other Williams. Frentzen impressed by taking fifth in his Sauber, with Gianni Morbidelli – back in F1 after contesting the 1993 Italian Superturismo Championship – taking sixth in his Footwork. The top ten was completed by Karl Wendlinger in the second Sauber, Mika Häkkinen in the McLaren, Verstappen in the second Benetton and Ukyo Katayama in the Tyrrell. Of the two new teams, Bertrand Gachot qualified 25th in his Pacific and David Brabham 26th in his Simtek, with their respective teammates Paul Belmondo and Ratzenberger failing to qualify.

Qualifying classification

Race report 
At the start Senna led from pole position, while Alesi overtook Schumacher. Schumacher retook second place on lap 2 and started chasing after Senna, who had pulled a four-second lead in the opening laps. Before the pit stops Schumacher had reduced the gap to just over a second, and on lap 21 the leading pair entered the pit lane together. Despite both teams running the same fuel strategy, Schumacher's stop was faster than Senna's, and thus he took the lead.

On lap 35, there was a four-car pile-up as Eddie Irvine and Verstappen came up to lap the Ligier of Éric Bernard. All three were rapidly closing up on Martin Brundle's McLaren which had suffered an engine failure. Faced with the prospect of colliding with the McLaren, Irvine jinked left as Verstappen attempted an overtake on that side thus forcing Verstappen on to the grass; Verstappen then lost control of his car and somersaulted over the McLaren whilst Bernard took avoiding action to the right. Brundle's helmet was impacted by the airborne Benetton although he escaped serious injury. Irvine was subsequently sanctioned by the FIA with a one-race ban, which was increased to three after the appeal of Jordan failed; Irvine was already under investigation due to an incident with Senna in Suzuka the year before.

Schumacher increased his lead to 10 seconds after the second round of pit stops, after which Senna started to close. By lap 55 the pair had lapped third-place runner Hill and the gap was down to 5 seconds, but then Senna lost control of his Williams and retired. After Senna's retirement Schumacher won comfortably, a lap ahead of Hill in second place and Alesi finishing third. Rubens Barrichello, Katayama and Wendlinger completed the top six, Katayama scoring his first points.

Race classification

Championship standings after the race

Drivers' Championship standings

Constructors' Championship standings

References

Brazilian Grand Prix
Brazilian Grand Prix
Grand Prix
Brazilian Grand Prix